is an amusement park in Gamagōri, Aichi, Japan. It is home to the Aqua Wind, Pirates' Blast and Stellar roller coasters. The park was also the first Magiquest live role playing game location outside of the United States.

Lagunasia was opened on April 25, 2002. The construction of the amusement park is located in the Laguna Gamagōri, a resort which was a renewal project around the coast of Gamagōri city.

References

External links
 

Amusement parks in Japan
Buildings and structures in Aichi Prefecture
2002 establishments in Japan
Tourist attractions in Aichi Prefecture
Gamagōri, Aichi
Amusement parks opened in 2002